Gerónimo Luis Saccardi Román (1 October 1949 – 4 May 2002) was an Argentine football midfielder and manager.

Club career
Born Buenos Aires, Saccardi played the vast majority of his career with Ferro Carril Oeste, appearing in 358 games in the Primera División and scoring 44 goals for his main club overall.

From 1975 to 1979 Saccardi competed in Spain in representation of Hércules CF, always in La Liga. After his second spell in Ferro (four seasons, ten in total) he later managed the team, first alongside Oscar Garré then as head coach.

Death
Saccardi died on 4 May 2002 in Moreno, Buenos Aires. He was 52 years old.

References

External links

 
 
 

1949 births
2002 deaths
Footballers from Buenos Aires
Argentine footballers
Association football midfielders
Argentine Primera División players
Ferro Carril Oeste footballers
La Liga players
Hércules CF players
Argentina international footballers
Argentine expatriate footballers
Expatriate footballers in Spain
Argentine expatriate sportspeople in Spain
Argentine football managers
Ferro Carril Oeste managers
Gimnasia y Esgrima de Jujuy managers
Estudiantes de Buenos Aires managers